Vasile Odobescu (born Cuizăuca) was a founder and leader of the anti-Soviet organization Democratic Agrarian Party.

Biography
Vasile Odobescu was born in Cuizăuca, a locality in the north of Moldova. During the Soviet deportations from Bessarabia and Northern Bukovina, his parents and his sister were deported from Moldovan SSR (Bessarabia) to Siberia.

In 1950 he founded the Democratic Agrarian Party, one of the largest and best anti-Soviet resistance organizations in rural areas of the Moldovan SSR. The leaders of the party were Vasile Odobescu and Simion Zlatan (born in Popenchi, Rîbnița). The Democratic Agrarian Party was active between 1950 and 1953.

In 1953, Vasile Odobescu and other important members of the party were arrested. In 1953, Vasile Odobescu and 10 other party members were sentenced to death.

In a book printed in 2000, the historian Ion Țurcanu wrote the chapter "Vasile Odobescu, a soldier of the disinherited people".

See also
 Democratic Agrarian Party

References

Bibliography
 Ion Ţurcanu, "Vasile Odobescu, un ostaş al dezmoşteniţilor", in Moldova antisovietică. Aspecte din lupta basarabenilor  împotriva ocupaţiei sovietice. 1944–1953. Ed. Prut Internaţional, colecţia Clio (coordonator, Ion Negrei, Chişinău, 2000. Editată cu sprijinul Fundaţiei Soros, Moldova.

External links 
 Raportul Comisiei Cojocaru
 Drama Basarabiei
 Preluarea  puterii şi instaurarea dictaturii comuniste
 Raportul privind crimele comunismului in Basarabia

Romanian people of Moldovan descent
1953 deaths
Moldovan activists
Moldovan anti-communists
Moldovan prisoners and detainees
Soviet dissidents
Soviet prisoners and detainees
Year of birth missing